Chytonidia is a genus of moths of the family Noctuidae. The genus was described by Schaus in 1914.

Taxonomy
Lepidoptera and Some Other Life Forms gives this name as a synonym of Leucosigma H. Druce, 1908.

Species
Chytonidia albiplaga Hampson, 1914
Chytonidia chloristis Schaus, 1914
Chytonidia variegata Wileman, 1914

References

Acronictinae